This is a list of defunct airlines of Romania.

See also
 List of airlines of Romania
 List of airports in Romania

References

Romania
Airlines
Airlines, defunct